A pencil drawing is a drawing that is made with a pencil (which is composed of wood and graphite).

History
Pencil drawings were not known before the 17th century, with the modern concept of pencil drawings taking shape in 18th and 19th century. Pencil drawings succeeded the older metalpoint drawing stylus, which used metal instead of graphite.

Modern artists continue to use the graphite pencil for artworks and sketches.

Modern Pencil Drawing

Color pencil drawing 
Drawings that are done by color pencils which bring a more lively appearance and make them look more realistic. A great number of people consider them as a gift for special occasions for the unique value pencil portraits bring.

Charcoal pencil drawing 
With the use of charcoal pencil, artists can create beautiful drawing with their hands and well-trained talents.
https://www.pencilperceptions.com/web-stories/learn-pencil-sketch-in-8-simple-steps/ pencil sketch

References

Further reading
 

 

Drawing